Gwaram is a Local Government Area of Jigawa State, Nigeria. Its headquarters are in the town of Gwaram.
 

The postal code of the area is 721.

References

Local Government Areas in Jigawa State